Xiaowei Zhuang (born January 1972) is a Chinese-American biophysicist who is the David B. Arnold Jr. Professor of Science, Professor of Chemistry and Chemical Biology, and Professor of Physics at Harvard University, and an Investigator at the Howard Hughes Medical Institute. She is best known for her work in the development of Stochastic Optical Reconstruction Microscopy (STORM), a super-resolution fluorescence microscopy method, and the discoveries of novel cellular structures using STORM. She received a 2019 Breakthrough Prize in Life Sciences for developing super-resolution imaging techniques that get past the diffraction limits of traditional light microscopes, allowing scientists to visualize small structures within living cells. She was elected a Member of the American Philosophical Society in 2019 and was awarded a Vilcek Foundation Prize in Biomedical Science in 2020.

Early life and education
Zhuang's father Zhuang Lixian and mother Zhu Renzhi are both professors at the University of Science and Technology of China (USTC).

Zhuang graduated from the USTC with a B.S. in Physics in 1991. She obtained her Ph.D. in Physics from the University of California, Berkeley in 1996 and conducted her thesis research under the supervision of Dr. Yuen-Ron Shen. In 1997-2001, she was a Chodorow Postdoctoral Fellow in the laboratory of Dr. Steven Chu at Stanford University. She started her faculty position in the Department of Chemistry and Chemical Biology and the Department of Physics at Harvard University in 2001 and was promoted to full professor in 2006.

She was named a Howard Hughes Medical Investigator in 2005.

Research
Zhuang's laboratory invented Stochastic Optical Reconstruction Microscopy (STORM), a single-molecule-based super-resolution fluorescence microscopy method. The Zhuang laboratory demonstrated three-dimensional super-resolution imaging with STORM. The Zhuang laboratory also discovered several photoswitchable dye molecules that enabled STORM imaging and demonstrated live-cell STORM imaging.

Using STORM, Zhuang and colleagues have studied a variety of biological systems, ranging from single-cell organisms to complex brain tissues. These studies led to the discovery of novel cellular structures, such as the periodic membrane skeletons in the axons of neurons and provided insights into many other cellular structures.

The Zhuang laboratory invented a single-cell transcriptome imaging method, MERFISH (multiplexed error-robust fluorescence in situ hybridization), which allows numerous RNA species to be imaged and quantified in single cells in their native context. Zhuang and colleagues used single-molecule FRET to study biomolecules and molecular complexes and developed single-virus tracking methods to study virus-cell interactions.

Honors and awards
 2022: Heinrich Wieland Prize
 2021: Lurie Prize in Biomedical Sciences
 2020: Vilcek Foundation Prize in Biomedical Science
 2019: Pearl Meister Greengard Prize
 2019: NAS Award for Scientific Discovery
 2019: Breakthrough Prize in Life Sciences 
 2018: Dr. H.P. Heineken Prize for Biochemistry and Biophysics, Royal Netherlands Academy of Arts and Sciences
 2018: Pittsburgh Analytical Chemistry Award
 2017: Honorary doctorate, Delft University of Technology
 2017: Lennart Nilsson Award, Karolinska Institute, Sweden
 2016: Doctor of Philosophy Honoris Causa, Stockholm University
 2015: Foreign academician of the Chinese Academy of Sciences
 2015: NAS Award in Molecular Biology
 2013: Member American Academy of Arts and Sciences
 2012: Member National Academy of Sciences
 2012: Fellow American Physical Society
 2012: Fellow American Association for the Advancement of Science
 2011: Sackler Prize
 2010: Max Delbruck Prize
 2008: Coblentz Award
 2007: ACS Award in Pure Chemistry
 2004: Sloan Fellowship
 2003: Packard Fellowship
 2003: MacArthur Fellows Program
 2003: Beckman Young Investigators Award

References

1972 births
Living people
American biophysicists
Harvard University faculty
Howard Hughes Medical Investigators
MacArthur Fellows
UC Berkeley College of Letters and Science alumni
University of Science and Technology of China alumni
Members of the United States National Academy of Sciences
Foreign members of the Chinese Academy of Sciences
Scientists from Nantong
Chinese emigrants to the United States
Chinese biophysicists
American women biologists
Chinese women biologists
American women physicists
Chinese women physicists
Physicists from Jiangsu
Educators from Nantong
Members of the American Philosophical Society
Biologists from Jiangsu
People from Rugao
Women in optics
American women academics
21st-century American women
Fellows of the American Physical Society